Onecote is a village and civil parish on the B5053 road, near Leek, in the Staffordshire Moorlands district, in the county of Staffordshire, England. The population as taken at the 2011 census was 220.  Onecote has a parish church dedicated to St Luke. The Peak District Boundary Walk runs through the village.

See also
Listed buildings in Onecote

References

External links 

 Genuki
 http://www.peakdistrictinformation.com/towns/onecote.php
 British-history
 http://www.wishful-thinking.org.uk/genuki/STS/Onecote/MIs.html
 Listed buildings in Onecote

Staffordshire Moorlands
Towns and villages of the Peak District
Villages in Staffordshire
Civil parishes in Staffordshire